Verbena aristigera (syns. Glandularia aristigera and Verbena tenuisecta), variously called the moss verbena, desert verbena, fine leafed verbena, wild verbena, tuber vervain, South American mock vervain, Mayne's curse and Mayne's pest, is a species of flowering plant in the family Verbenaceae. It is native to Bolivia, southern Brazil, northern Argentina, Paraguay and Uruguay. It has been widely introduced to the rest of the world's drier tropics and subtropics, including California, Guatemala, Honduras, Nicaragua, Venezuela, Greece, Nigeria, eastern and southern Africa, India, and all of Australia except Tasmania.

References

aristigera
Flora of Bolivia
Flora of West-Central Brazil
Flora of Southeast Brazil
Flora of South Brazil
Flora of Paraguay
Flora of Northwest Argentina
Flora of Northeast Argentina
Flora of Uruguay
Plants described in 1895
Taxa named by Spencer Le Marchant Moore